The 1989 Brazilian Grand Prix was a Formula One motor race held at Jacarepaguá, Rio de Janeiro on 26 March 1989. It was the first race of the 1989 Formula One World Championship.

The 61-lap race was won by Englishman Nigel Mansell, driving a Ferrari, with Frenchman Alain Prost second in a McLaren-Honda and local driver Maurício Gugelmin third in a March-Judd. It was the first time that a car with a semi-automatic gearbox won the race. Mansell had joked that he had booked an early flight home as he did not expect to win, and during the podium ceremony he cut his hand whilst lifting the trophy.

Qualifying

Pre-qualifying report
Several teams were required to participate in the Friday morning pre-qualifying sessions during 1989, in order to reduce the field to thirty cars for the main qualifying sessions on Friday afternoon and Saturday. At the midway point of the season, the pre-qualifying group was to be reassessed, with the more successful, points-scoring teams being allowed to avoid pre-qualifying, and unsuccessful teams being required to pre-qualify from mid-season onwards. 

At this first Grand Prix of 1989 in Brazil, five cars were allowed to progress. The AGS team had expanded from one car to two, and their first car, to be driven by Philippe Streiff, was not required to pre-qualify. However, the Frenchman had been paralysed in a midweek testing crash at the circuit, which ended his career. He was not replaced for the Grand Prix weekend, allowing an extra car to progress from the pre-qualifying session.

The FIRST team withdrew before the event, as the car had failed a mandatory FIA pre-season crash test. This left thirteen cars participating in the session. They included the two Brabhams, as the team had not participated in 1988, and the new Onyx team with their two-car entry. Also included were the two Zakspeeds and the two Osellas. This left five other cars: the sole single-car entry from EuroBrun, and the second cars of the four teams expanding from one car to two for 1989, namely AGS, Coloni, Dallara and Rial.

During the session, the two Brabhams of Martin Brundle and Stefano Modena were considerably faster than the other entrants, securing a comfortable 1–2. Third was the EuroBrun driven by debutant Swiss driver Gregor Foitek, and fourth was the Osella of Nicola Larini. The fortunate fifth fastest runner, who also went through to qualifying on this occasion, was Zakspeed's Bernd Schneider.

Missing out in sixth was Alex Caffi in the Dallara, ahead of veteran Piercarlo Ghinzani in the other Osella. Another newcomer, German driver Volker Weidler was eighth in the Rial, with Pierre-Henri Raphanel's Coloni ninth, ahead of Joachim Winkelhock, also competing in Formula One for the first time, in the AGS. Eleventh was the second Zakspeed of Aguri Suzuki, with the Onyx drivers a little way adrift at the bottom of the time sheets, having had little time to test their new car. Stefan Johansson was faster than his Belgian team-mate Bertrand Gachot, the other driver in the session to make his Formula One debut, but was still over seven seconds slower than Brundle's time.

Pre-qualifying classification

Qualifying report
Ayrton Senna took pole position in qualifying ahead of Riccardo Patrese, making a record-breaking 177th appearance at a Grand Prix, and Gerhard Berger in the new Ferrari 640, which featured the first semi-automatic gearbox in Formula One. For Patrese it was actually his first front row start since he started second at the 1983 European Grand Prix at Brands Hatch, a gap of 81 races. On his debut for Ferrari, Berger's teammate Nigel Mansell qualified sixth. After the race Mansell joked that he was so convinced of his new car's unreliability that he had booked an early flight home.

Johnny Herbert (Benetton) and Olivier Grouillard (Ligier) both qualified for their first Formula One races.

Qualifying classification

Race

Race report
At the start, Nicola Larini was disqualified for an illegal start. Mansell became the first man since Mario Andretti in 1971 to win on his Formula One debut for Ferrari, a feat that was not matched until Kimi Räikkönen won for Ferrari at the 2007 Australian Grand Prix. It was also the first race ever to be won by a car with a semi-automatic gearbox. Mansell cut his hands on the trophy following the race. He was joined on the podium by McLaren's Alain Prost and March's Maurício Gugelmin, making his first appearance on the podium. Johnny Herbert, still recovering from his horrifying Formula 3000 crash at Brands Hatch six months earlier, finished 4th on his Formula 1 debut for Benetton, 1.123 seconds behind Gugelmin and 7.748 seconds in front of teammate Alessandro Nannini who finished 6th.

The hard luck of the story of the race was Arrows driver Derek Warwick. There was a problem fitting a rear wheel during his second stop for tyres which lost him over 25 seconds. He eventually finished in fifth place, less than 18 seconds behind Mansell suggesting that the pit stop may have cost Warwick and Arrows their maiden Grand Prix victories.

Warwick's Arrows teammate Eddie Cheever collapsed after exiting his car following the collision involving the Zakspeed of Bernd Schneider that ended his race. Arrows actually had to modify Cheever's car after he failed the FIA safety check where a driver had five seconds to be able to exit their car. The new Ross Brawn designed Arrows A11 was a tight fit for the tall American and he had trouble fitting into the car before practice. Schneider, whose car carried the new Yamaha V8 engine, only got into the race after Philippe Streiff's crash and the FIA had allowed five pre-qualifiers to enter the main field instead of four. Schneider did not qualify for another race until the season's penultimate round in Japan some seven months later. His new teammate Aguri Suzuki ultimately failed to qualify for all 16 rounds of the 1989 season.

This was the last Formula One race at Jacarepaguá and in Rio de Janeiro. From 1990, the Brazilian Grand Prix would be held at a shortened Interlagos in São Paulo, the home town of Ayrton Senna, where it is today.

Race classification

Championship standings after the race

Drivers' Championship standings

Constructors' Championship standings

References

 Pre-qualifying results from FIA Yearbook 1989

Brazilian Grand Prix
Brazilian Grand Prix
Grand Prix
Brazilian Grand Prix